Ellis Hargreaves was an English professional association footballer who played as an inside forward. He played in the Football League with Burnley and Darwen.

References

Year of birth unknown
Year of death unknown
English footballers
Association football forwards
Burnley F.C. players
Tottenham Hotspur F.C. players
Darwen F.C. players
English Football League players